Simon Pontdemé (born 4 May 1988) is a French professional footballer who plays as a goalkeeper for Championnat National 2 club Chambly.

Career 
Pontdemé won three caps for the France under-18 national team in the 2006–07 season.

Career statistics

References

External links
 

1988 births
Living people
People from Niort
Sportspeople from Deux-Sèvres
French footballers
Chamois Niortais F.C. players
Stade Brestois 29 players
AJ Auxerre players
Le Havre AC players
Le Mans FC players
FC Chambly Oise players
US Boulogne players
Ligue 2 players
Championnat National players
Championnat National 2 players
Championnat National 3 players
Association football goalkeepers
France youth international footballers
Footballers from Nouvelle-Aquitaine